The National Environmental Award was an annual honor given by Spain's Ministry of Environment from 1986 to 2009. In 2009, its last year, each of the two awardees was endowed with 22,000 euros.

List of awardees

See also

 List of environmental awards

References

1986 establishments in Spain
2009 disestablishments in Spain
Awards disestablished in 2009
Awards established in 1986
Environmental awards
Environment of Spain
Spanish awards